Mrs. Wilkes' Dining Room is a casual restaurant in Savannah, Georgia, which offers a menu of Southern home cooking. Situated in a historic house dated to 1870, it is a popular dining spot in the city. The restaurant was owned and managed by Sema Wilkes for 59 years, from 1943 until her death in 2002 at age 95.

History
Mrs. Wilkes' Dining Room was previously the dining hall of the Wilkes House, a downtown boardinghouse. Today the restaurant is housed on the ground floor of the same historic house, built in 1870, at 107 West Jones Street. The restaurant was described by author William Schemmel as "a treasure hidden away in a historic district town-house." Its longtime owner, Sema Wilkes, published several cookbooks. Her family continues to run the restaurant today, but it is now open only for lunch.

Mrs. Wilkes and her restaurant have been featured in newspapers and magazines. Japanese chef Hoshinao Naguma was once apprenticed to the restaurant.

Customs
Mrs. Wilkes' is noted for its homestyle traditions, in which guests are escorted in shifts of ten into the dining room, where a variety of dishes are freshly laid on one of several long tables. There is no menu; dishes are selected by the restaurant and change daily. Travel Holiday in 1993 recalled that the "tables were set with steaming bowls and platters of tasty Southern food". Jeff Gordinier of The New York Times noted in a 2015 article: "it’s no secret that visitors mad for Midnight in the Garden of Good and Evil make a beeline for Mrs. Wilkes Dining Room for fried chicken, candied yams and macaroni and cheese".

The guests sit at the table and pass the dishes around to one another in the style of a family. There are usually long queues waiting to get in.

Notable guests
 David Brinkley once broadcast directly from the restaurant
 President Obama ate at the restaurant with Mayor Otis Johnson and other guests in 2010, having baked beans, fried chicken, and sweet corn
 Robert Duvall, Kate Smith, and Gregory Peck ate at the restaurant
 The cast of Magic Mike XXL ate at the restaurant in October 2014

Gallery

See also
 List of James Beard America's Classics

References

External links
 Official website
 Official Georgia Tourism & Travel Site
 U.S. President Barack Obama dining at the restaurant in 2010 – The Obama White House YouTube channel, March 2, 2010

1870 establishments in Georgia (U.S. state)
1943 establishments in Georgia (U.S. state)
Houses completed in 1870
Restaurants established in 1943
Restaurants in Savannah, Georgia
James Beard Foundation Award winners